The Russian occupation of Kharkiv Oblast, officially the Kharkov Military–Civilian Administration, is an ongoing military occupation that began on 24 February 2022, after Russian forces invaded Ukraine and began capturing and occupying parts of Kharkiv Oblast, Ukraine. Russian forces failed to capture the capital of the oblast, Kharkiv. However, other major cities including Izium, Kupiansk, and Balakliia were captured by Russian forces. The city of Chuhuiv was captured by Russian forces on 25 February, but was recaptured by Ukrainian forces on 7 March. As of November 2022, Russian forces only occupy a small portion of land in the Kharkiv Oblast.

In early September 2022, Ukraine began a major counteroffensive, regaining several settlements in the region and ending numerous Russian military or military-civilian administrations. By 11 September, Russia had withdrawn from most of the settlements it previously occupied in the oblast, including Izium, Kupiansk and Vovchansk. The Russian Ministry of Defense also announced a formal withdrawal of Russian forces from all of Kharkiv Oblast west of the Oskil river stating that an "operation to curtail and transfer troops" was underway."

The Kharkov Military-Civilian Administration, originally based in Kupiansk, briefly relocated to Vovchansk on 8 September 2022, but moved again before the city was recaptured by Ukrainian forces on 11 September 2022. As of 18 September 2022, Russian forces only occupy a small strip of Kharkiv Oblast east of the Oskil. On 13 September 2022, Ukrainian forces had reportedly crossed the Oskil and had set up positions at multiple locations. On 16 September 2022, Ukrainian forces claimed to have recaptured Kupiansk-Vuzlovyi, Kupiansk's sister city on the eastern bank of the Oskil.

On 3 October 2022, Russian forces fled from Nyzhche Solone, Pidlyman, Nyzhnya Zhuravka, Borova, and Shyikivka, allowing Ukrainian authorities to regain control of almost all of the oblast. On the same day, the Russian military–civilian administration in Kharkiv Oblast effectively collapsed.

Occupation 

On 8 July 2022, Vitaly Ganchev said that Kharkiv is an "inalienable" part of Russian territory and intended for Kharkiv to be annexed by the Russian Federation via referendum. But on 11 August, Ganchev told the Russia-24 TV channel that the authorities of the territories of the Kharkiv Oblast controlled by Russian troops are not yet ready to discuss a referendum on joining Russia, because "only 20 percent and no more" of the region is under Russian control. According to Ukrainian intelligence, before the Ukrainian counteroffensive, Russia planned to hold a referendum in Kharkiv Oblast in November, with a planned 75% vote in favour of joining Russia.

Izium 

The city of Izium was captured by Russian forces on 1 April 2022, beginning the Russian military occupation of the city.

On 3 April 2022, the Ukrainian government stated that two Russian soldiers were killed and 28 others hospitalized after Ukrainian civilians handed out poisoned cakes to Russian soldiers of the Russian 3rd Motor Rifle Division in Izium.

On 4 April 2022, The Guardian reported, based on eyewitness reports by residents and military officials, that intense fighting continued near Izium. According to The Guardian, city inhabitants had survived in their basements for three weeks without electricity, heating or running water. The report also claimed that Russian soldiers had prepared lists of individuals to “hunt”: gun owners, wealthy people and others deemed “dangerous” such as businessmen, activists, military, and their families. The Russian army was also accused of barring passage of humanitarian convoys while food and medicine available in the city was running out.

On 10 April 2022, several US defense officials stated that Russian forces were massing in Izium in preparation for an offensive campaign between Izium and Dnipro. Russian forces had been reportedly redeploying forces from the Kyiv axis and the Sumy axis to Izium from April 5.

On 18 April 2022, Ukraine claimed the recapture of a "number of settlements" in or near the Izium area. Russian forces in the city were beginning mass deportations of city residents towards the territory of the Russian Federation.

On 21 April 2022, Russia appointed Vitaly Ganchev as head of the Kharkiv military-civilian administration. On 19 August Andrey Alekseyenko was appointed first deputy head of the Kharkiv military-civilian administration and Prime Minister.

Ukraine began a counteroffensive in the Kharkiv region in early September. As of 10 September 2022, Ukraine recaptured Izium, ending the military-civilian administration and Russian occupation of the city.

Velykyi Burluk 
The community of Velykyi Burluk was captured by Russian forces sometime in March 2022. The Russians began a military occupation, and later set up a military-civilian administration. On 8 April 2022, Russian forces routed an 13-mile long convoy of armored cars and trucks through Velikyi Burluk. On 11 July 2022, the Russian-appointed military-civilian administration leader, Yevgeny Yunakov, was assassinated in a car bombing.

Occupation representative Vitaly Ganchev stated the village was shelled on 9 September and advised citizens to evacuate.

By 11 September, Ukrainian forces recaptured the village and ended its Russian occupation.

Balakliia 
The town of Balakliia was initially captured by pro-Russian forces on 3 March 2022 during the early stages of the Russian invasion.

On 6 September 2022, the Armed Forces of Ukraine conducted a large counteroffensive in the Balakliia direction, liberating nearby settlements and suburbs including Verbivka, Nova Husarivka, and Bayrak.

By 8 September 2022, Ukrainian forces fully recaptured the city. Video footage was later released of Ukrainian soldiers flying the Ukrainian flag atop the District Administration Building, with the Russian flag laid on the ground.

By the evening of 8 September, Ukrainian forces had penetrated over 50 km into formerly occupied territory and were already on the outskirts of the road and rail hub of Kupiansk, potentially severing Russian a supply and communications line south to Izium.

On 10 September, Ukraine fully recaptured the city, ending the military occupation in the city.

Zaliznychne 
Following the end of the Russian occupation on September 10, multiple bodies were discovered in the town of Zaliznychne, reportedly killed by Russian troops during the early days of the war.

Control of settlements

See also 
 Outline of the Russo-Ukrainian War
 Russian-occupied territories of Ukraine

Notes

References 

Kharkiv
Kharkiv military-
civilian administration
States and territories disestablished in 2022
History of Kharkiv Oblast
Eastern Ukraine offensive
February 2022 events in Ukraine
March 2022 events in Ukraine
April 2022 events in Ukraine
May 2022 events in Ukraine
June 2022 events in Ukraine
July 2022 events in Ukraine
August 2022 events in Ukraine
September 2022 events in Ukraine